Vĩnh Hưng is a rural district of Long An province in the Mekong Delta region of Vietnam. As of 2003 the district had a population of 43,777. The district covers an area of 382 km². The district capital lies at Vĩnh Hưng.

References

Districts of Long An province